The United Kingdom of Great Britain and Northern Ireland competed as Great Britain at the 1980 Winter Olympics in Lake Placid, United States.

Medallists

Alpine skiing

Men

Women

Biathlon

Men

Men's 4 x 7.5 km relay

 1 A penalty loop of 150 metres had to be skied per missed target.
 2 One minute added per close miss (a hit in the outer ring), two minutes added per complete miss.

Bobsleigh

Cross-country skiing

Men

Figure skating

Men

Women

Pairs

Ice Dancing

Luge

Men

(Men's) Doubles

Women

Speed skating

Men

Women

References
Official Olympic Reports
International Olympic Committee results database
 Olympic Winter Games 1980, full results by sports-reference.com

Nations at the 1980 Winter Olympics
1980 Winter Olympics
Winter Olympics
Winter sports in the United Kingdom